Sammy Vomáčka (born Jiří Vomáčka; 17 August 1946 in Brandýs nad Labem) is a Czech guitarist. He started as a rock musician. Since the late 1960s he lived in Germany and later toured in Europe and the United States. He returned to Czechoslovakia after the Velvet Revolution and played there many concerts.

Discography
Ragtime Guitar (1974)
Come to My Kitchen (1975)
Rags & Tunes (1977)
Live! (1980)
Ragtime, Blues & Jazz Guitar (1998)

References

External links

1946 births
Living people
Czech guitarists
Male guitarists